The Karni border crossing attack was a suicide bombing on January 13, 2005, at the pedestrian/cargo terminal Karni Crossing located on the Israeli Gaza Strip barrier. Six Israeli civilians were killed in the attack and five Israelis were injured in the attack.

Hamas, the Al Aqsa Martyrs Brigades and the Popular Resistance Committees claimed joint responsibility for the attack.

The attack
On Thursday, January 13, 2005, at around 22:45 pm, a squad of three Palestinians militants armed with AK-47s and hand grenades, parked a truck loaded with a 200-pound explosive device, on the Palestinian side of the fence near an iron door that separates the Israeli and Palestinian sides at the Karni Crossing checkpoint. At 22:45 pm the squad detonated the explosives which created a hole through the iron door. Immediately afterwards the militants penetrated into the Israeli side of the Karni crossing through the hole in the iron door. The militant squad threw grenades and fired their assault weapons at the Israeli civilians on the site.

During the attack the Palestinian militant squad managed to kill 6 Israeli civilians (truck drivers and workers of the Port Authority) and in addition managed to injure five Israeli civilians.

The following exchange of fire between the Israeli soldiers stationed at the site and the Palestinian militants resulted in the killing of all three attackers.

The perpetrators 
Three Palestinian militant groups claimed joint responsibility for the attack, including Hamas, the Al Aqsa Martyrs Brigades and the Popular Resistance Committees.

After the attack, Abu Abir, a spokesman for the Popular Resistance Committees, stated to the press, "the attack is a continuation of the resistance."

Official reactions
Involved parties
: Israeli officials stated, "The prime minister has ordered suspension of all contacts with Palestinian Authority representatives and the closure of all Gaza terminals until real steps are taken against terrorist acts."

: Newly elected President of the Palestinian National Authority Mahmoud Abbas condemned the attack.

See also 
 Erez Crossing bombing (January 14, 2004)

External links

Terror attack at Karni Crossing - published at the Israeli Ministry of Foreign Affairs
Suicide attack at Gaza Crossing - BBC News
Inquiry: Karni attackers had false permits - Haaretz, January 16, 2005
Large Bomb Kills Six Israelis at Gaza Checkpoint, The Washington Post, January 14, 2005
Explosion kills six Israelis - The Age, January 15, 2005

References

Mass murder in 2005
Terrorist incidents in Israel in 2005
Terrorist attacks attributed to Palestinian militant groups
Spree shootings in Israel
Car and truck bombings in the Israeli–Palestinian conflict
Suicide bombing in the Israeli–Palestinian conflict
January 2005 events in Asia
Hamas suicide bombings
Islamic terrorism in Israel